Skopinsky District is an administrative and municipal district (raion), one of the twenty-five in Ryazan Oblast, Russia. It is located in the southwest of the oblast. Its administrative center is the town of Skopin (which is not administratively a part of the district). Population: 27,080 (2010 Census);

Administrative and municipal status
Within the framework of administrative divisions, Skopinsky District is one of the twenty-five in the oblast. The town of Skopin serves as its administrative center, despite being incorporated separately as a town of oblast significance—an administrative unit with the status equal to that of the districts.

As a municipal division, the district is incorporated as Skopinsky Municipal District. The town of oblast significance of Skopin is incorporated separately from the district as Skopin Urban Okrug.

References

Notes

Sources
 
 

Districts of Ryazan Oblast
